Minot International Airport  is in Ward County, North Dakota, United States, two miles north of the city of Minot, which owns it. The National Plan of Integrated Airport Systems for 2011–2015 categorized it as a primary commercial service airport.

MOT currently handles between ten and fifteen commercial flights a day from three airlines, as well as various charters and general aviation traffic. For many years Northwest Airlines, followed by Delta Air Lines, was the airport's sole commercial carrier but an economic and population boom have resulted in other carriers adding flights as well. Delta Air Lines, United Airlines, and Allegiant Airlines currently offer flights to Minneapolis, Denver, Phoenix/Mesa, and Las Vegas, respectively.

Minot International has no scheduled passenger airline service out of the country, but receives its international title (like many other airports) because of its customs service. Customs service is available for aircraft arriving from Canada and other countries.  The Transportation Security Administration (TSA) fully searches all passengers and carry-on luggage prior to boarding, rather than using a selective process as is the case at major airports.

Delta Air Lines operates up to six daily flights to Minneapolis-Saint Paul International Airport. All are on Delta Connection to Minneapolis. Delta Air Lines commands the largest percentage of MOT travelers.

United Airlines became Minot's second largest airline in 2010. It currently operates four daily flights to Denver International Airport. United also flies multiple weekly charters to Houston, Texas.

Allegiant Airlines became the airport's third airline in 2010, with flights to Las Vegas, then added service to Phoenix-Mesa. The number of flights to each destination fluctuates.

Frontier Airlines became the airport's fourth airline in 2012 with four flights per week to Denver International Airport. Though passenger loads were high, Frontier discontinued service from Minot in 2015 due to restructuring of  The original Frontier Airlines served Minot on a route that connected it with Saskatoon, Regina, and Denver; bankruptcy halted that airline's operations in 1986.

Facilities
It has two runways: 13/31 is  feet concrete and 8/26 is  asphalt. Its longest runway can receive Boeing 747s.

In the year ending June 30, 2012, the airport had 49,156 aircraft operations, average 134 per day: 62% general aviation, 14% airline, 13% military, and 10% air taxi. 127 aircraft were then based at this airport: 92% single-engine, 5% multi-engine, 2% jet, and 1% helicopter.

In 2013, aircraft operations dropped to 32,023 for the fiscal year. Itinerant general aviation operations is still the highest percentage of operations with 10,429. Air carrier is at 6,825 and air taxi is at 5,201. Finally, for itinerant operations, military made up 283. Local operations include 6,898 civil and 2,387 military operations. Based aircraft has dropped to 112 housed aircraft.

Avflight is the fixed-base operator at the airport, offering a 24 hour fueling station for quick turns and efficient technology stops. Other services include catering, Customs, international garbage disposal, and rental cars.

Minot Aero Center is a maintenance business at the airport, offering flight training, maintenance and general aircraft services.

Historical airline service
Braniff Airways started service in 1952 with one daily departure south to Bismarck with DC-3 equipment. The original Frontier Airlines started new service on May 1, 1959, with three daily departures to Bismarck on 26 passenger DC-3s. North Central Airlines had four daily departures in July 1960 on DC-3 equipment; the service went to Bismarck and Devils Lake, east of Minot.

Airlines and destinations

Passenger

Allegiant Air uses Airbus A319-111s and Airbus A320-214s to Las Vegas and Phoenix. Delta Connection uses Embraer E175s and Bombardier CRJ900s operated by SkyWest Airlines to Minneapolis. United Express uses Embraer ERJ145s operated by CommuteAir to Denver and Houston.

Statistics

Growth and future

Minot's growth in population and economy, along with the enormous influx of workers and residents due to the Bakken oil boom in western North Dakota, have increased air passenger numbers tremendously. Though Minot is the fourth largest city in North Dakota, the airport  is now the third-busiest. While the airport is only twenty years old, it was designed for roughly 100,000 passengers. This has strained airport infrastructure and resulted in makeshift changes such as temporary long term parking, additional hold-room areas, and other similar measures.

Minot's current situation and forecasted growth over the next twenty years warranted a study to identify alternatives to deal with that growth. Ultimately it was decided that the best option was a new terminal to be built directly east of the former terminal, which opened in the late 1980s. Design of the new terminal building was completed in May 2013, and included four to six gates, room for up to four car rental companies, additional restaurant space, additional check in areas for future new airlines, and greatly expanded parking facilities for short term, long term, and rental car parking.

Growing passenger numbers, parking issues, and the possibilities of new airlines and destinations made a new terminal at Minot International Airport a top priority. The projected $40 million terminal joined a list of other major improvements over the next three years which include additional apron, a new taxiway, a new Snow Removal Equipment building, additional parking and a new access road, with total investment around $98 million to cope with increased traffic.

The  new terminal, four times the size of its predecessor, opened on 

The old terminal building was demolished in November 2016, after the city of Minot voted to demolish the structure after the new terminal was completed. There is no definite plan for the area after the demolition, but the city is considering a car rental facility as a frontrunner to be built in the old terminal's place.

Ground Transportation
Minot City Transit buses do not directly serve the terminal, however, buses do travel along 3rd Street Northeast and Airport Road, where passengers may flag down any bus at an intersection.

See also
 Dakota Territory Air Museum
 Minot Air Force Base
 North Dakota World War II Army Airfields

References

External links
 
 Aerial image as of May 1995 from USGS The National Map
 
 
 

Airports in North Dakota
Buildings and structures in Minot, North Dakota
Transportation in Ward County, North Dakota
Airfields of the United States Army Air Forces in North Dakota